Arnaud Delorme is a university professor at Paul Sabatier University in Toulouse, an adjunct faculty member at the Swartz Center for Computational Neuroscience at University of California, San Diego, a consulting research scientist at the Institute of Noetic Sciences. At UCSD, Dr. Delorme contributed to development of the widely used Matlab toolbox for electroencephalography (EEG) analysis, EEGLAB. He has been acknowledged for his contribution to the field of EEG research by being awarded a Bettencourt-Schueller young investigator award in 2002 and one of three of the ANT EEG Company 10-year Anniversary Young Researcher Awards in 2006. His research has focused on pure neuroscience methods, as well as on the neuroscience of mind wandering, meditation, and so-called mediums.

References

Academic staff of the University of Toulouse
French expatriates in the United States
French neuroscientists
Living people
1974 births